Walter Alexander Humphreys (28 October 1849 – 22 March 1924) was an English cricketer. Humphreys was a right-handed batsman who bowled right-arm underarm slow.

Playing career
Humphreys made his first-class debut for Sussex in 1871 against Kent. Humphreys scored 44 opening the batting. From 1871 to 1896, Humphreys represented Sussex in 248 first-class matches and was regarded as one of the best county all rounders of his time. Successful with both bat and ball, Humphreys was a consistent performer with impressive statistics. On three occasions (1884, 1886, 1887) Humphreys passed the 500 run mark and on four occasions passed the 50 wicket mark, including in 1893 when he took 150 wickets at a bowling average of 17.32.

Humphreys final season with Sussex was the 1896 County Championship, with his final first-class match for the club coming against Cambridge University. At the end of his Sussex career his figures with both bat and ball were impressive for the time. With the bat 5,806 runs at an average of 16.2, with a top score one century, which came against Cambridge University in 1887 and yielded his highest first-class score of 116. In addition to a single century, Humphreys made sixteen half centuries and took 195 catches. With the ball Humphreys was more impressive, taking 682 wickets at an average of 20.72, with best figures of 8–83. Humphreys took 49 five wicket hauls and took ten wickets in a match eight times.

In 1900 Humphreys joined the county of his birth, Hampshire. Humphreys played two first-class matches, making his Hampshire debut against Kent, where he took figures of 5/71 on debut. His final first-class match came against Leicestershire. Humphreys took nine wickets at a bowling average of 27.33, with best figures of 5–71.

In addition to representing Sussex and Hampshire, Humphreys also played first-class matches for AE Stoddart's XI; CI Thornton's XI, an England XI; GN Wyatt's XI; Lord March's XI; Lord Sheffield's XI; Players; Players of the South; South of England and United South of England XI. With AE Stoddart's XI he toured Australia in 1894/95.

Overall, in first-class cricket Humphrey's scored 6,268 runs at an average of 16.11, with a top score of 117, which was his solitary century; Humphreys in addition made seventeen fifties. With the ball Humphreys took	718 wickets at a bowling average of 21.52, with best figures of 8–83. Humphreys took 51 five wicket hauls and took ten wickets in a match 8 times. Humphreys strike rate was an impressive wicket every 33.02 balls. An able fielder, Humphreys took 217 catches in all.

Humphreys umpired in four matches during the 1896 season, making his umpiring debut in a County Championship match between Gloucestershire and Yorkshire. Humphreys final first-class match standing as an umpire came in the same season in the match between the North and the touring Australians.  Outside of cricket Humphreys was a shoemaker by trade.  He died at Brighton, Sussex on 22 March 1924.  His son, Walter Humphreys Jr, and brother, George Humphreys, both represented Sussex in first-class cricket.

References

External links
Walter Humphreys at Cricinfo
Walter Humphreys at CricketArchive

1849 births
1924 deaths
People from Southsea
English cricketers
Sussex cricketers
Players cricketers
Hampshire cricketers
English cricket umpires
Shoemakers
Players of the South cricketers
United South of England Eleven cricketers
Non-international England cricketers
C. I. Thornton's XI cricketers
North v South cricketers
Lord March's XI cricketers
A. E. Stoddart's XI cricketers